Frances Aparicio is the author of Listening to Salsa: Gender, Latin Popular Music, and Puerto Rican Cultures. She is also the co-author of Musical Migrations: Transnationalism and Cultural Hybridity in Latin/o America, Volume I and Tropicalizations: Transcultural Representations of Latinidad (Re-Encounters with Colonialism). She is the editor of several books including Latino Voices. She has been a professor at Northwestern University and University of Illinois at Chicago, where she directed the Latina/Latino Studies Program.

She was born Frances Rivera in Puerto Rico on December 11, 1955. She moved to the United States to earn her bachelor's at Indiana University Bloomington. She earned a Ph.D at Harvard University. She is an editorial advisory board member of Chasqui, a Latin American and Latinx literature, philosophy, and arts journal.

References

1955 births
Living people
University of Illinois Chicago faculty
Indiana University Bloomington alumni
Harvard University alumni
American writers about music
Women writers about music
American women non-fiction writers